Amit Rawal (born 21 September 1963) is an Indian Judge of the Kerala High Court. The High Court of Kerala is the highest court in the Indian state of Kerala and in the Union Territory of Lakshadweep. The High Court of Kerala is headquartered at Ernakulam, Kochi.

Early life and career 
Justice Amit Rawal attended the Government Senior Model School, Sector 16, Chandigarh and participated in sports like hockey, ice skating, table tennis and cricket. After completing his graduation from DAV College, Chandigarh in 1983, he sought admission in the Law Department of Panjab University, Chandigarh, obtained a degree in Law in 1986 and was enrolled as member of Bar Council of Punjab and Haryana. He dealt with the matters pertaining to civil, property disputes, rent, matters involving intricate questions of law. He primarily practiced in the matters involving matrimonial disputes, winding up/amalgamation matters, writs involving vires of various acts etc. and also handled criminal matters. He represented the Bar Council of Punjab and Haryana in the High Court, besides various other institutions. He was designated as Senior Advocate on 8 May 2012. He had a short stint in the office of Advocate General, Punjab as Additional Advocate General. He was elevated as an Additional Judge of the Punjab and Haryana High Court on 25 September 2014 and thereafter he was appointed Permanent Judge of the Punjab and Haryana High Court on 23 May 2016.

References

1963 births
20th-century Indian judges
21st-century Indian judges
Living people
Judges of the Punjab and Haryana High Court
Judges of the Kerala High Court
Panjab University alumni